The Turkish National Badminton Championships is a tournament organized to crown the best badminton players in Turkey.

The tournament started in 1993 and is held every year.

Past winners

References
Details of affiliated national organisations at Badminton Europe
Turkish Badminton Federation Yearbook

Badminton tournaments in Turkey
National badminton championships
Recurring sporting events established in 1993
1993 establishments in Turkey